Lucas Herbert (born 5 December 1995) is an Australian professional golfer who plays on the European Tour and the PGA Tour. He has won twice on the European Tour; the 2020 Omega Dubai Desert Classic and the 2021 Dubai Duty Free Irish Open and once on the PGA Tour, the 2021 Butterfield Bermuda Championship.

Early life and amateur career
Herbert was born on 5 December 1995. He was raised in Bendigo (located in Victoria, Australia) and played his junior golf at Neangar Park Golf Club and Commonwealth Golf Club before turning professional. As an amateur he lost in a playoff for the Lexus of Blackburn Heritage Classic, a tournament on the 2013 PGA Tour of Australasia. He represented Australia in the 2014 Eisenhower Trophy where the team finished tied for 6th place. Herbert tied for the second-best individual score, three strokes behind Jon Rahm. He turned professional in late 2015.

Professional career
After turning professional, Herbert played mostly on the PGA Tour of Australasia. In late 2016, he was runner-up in the Isuzu Queensland Open behind amateur Brett Coletta. A year later, in the 2017 New South Wales Open, he was again runner-up, this time to Jason Scrivener and followed this with good finishes in the Emirates Australian Open and Australian PGA Championship.

In 2018, Herbert began playing the European Tour via sponsor exemptions, finishing 47th on the Race to Dubai and ending the year in the world top-100. He was runner-up in the Portugal Masters and had three third-place finishes, including the Sky Sports British Masters. A good result in the SMBC Singapore Open gave him an entry into the 2018 Open Championship where he made the cut. He also qualified for the 2018 U.S. Open, but missed the cut.

Herbert had a 7th-place finish in the 2019 Omega Dubai Desert Classic in January to reach a career high of 73 in the world rankings. However he only had one other top-10 finish, in the Omega European Masters, and finished 107th in the European Tour Order of Merit.

In January 2020, Herbert won his first European Tour event, the Omega Dubai Desert Classic, where he beat Christiaan Bezuidenhout in a playoff, lifting him back into the world top-100. In March 2020, he was runner-up in the New Zealand Open behind Brad Kennedy. 

In July 2021 he became a wire-to-wire winner of the Dubai Duty Free Irish Open, finishing three strokes ahead of Rikard Karlberg, a result which qualified him into The Open Championship in two weeks time. The following week, Herbert finished a stroke behind the leaders at the Abrdn Scottish Open, entering into the top 50 in the Official World Golf Ranking for the first time in his career. In August 2021, Herbert earned a place in the Korn Ferry Tour Finals in the category "Numbers 126-200 on PGA Tour Non-Member FedExCup Points List". He finished inside the top 25, to earn a PGA Tour card for the 2021–22 season. In October 2021, he won his first PGA Tour event at the Butterfield Bermuda Championship.

Amateur wins
2011 Tamar Valley Junior Cup, Victoria Junior Amateur
2012 New South Wales Boy's Amateur

Source:

Professional wins (3)

PGA Tour wins (1)

European Tour wins (2)

European Tour playoff record (1–0)

Playoff record
PGA Tour of Australasia playoff record (0–1)

Results in major championships
Results not in chronological order before 2019 and in 2020.

CUT = missed the half-way cut
"T" = tied
NT = No tournament due to COVID-19 pandemic

Results in The Players Championship

CUT = missed the halfway cut
"T" indicates a tie for a place

Results in World Golf Championships

1Cancelled due to COVID-19 pandemic

NT = No tournament
"T" = Tied
Note that the Championship and Invitational were discontinued from 2022.

Team appearances
Amateur
Eisenhower Trophy (representing Australia): 2014
Australian Men's Interstate Teams Matches (representing Victoria): 2013, 2014 (winners), 2015 (winners)

See also
2021 Korn Ferry Tour Finals graduates

References

External links
 
 
 
 

Australian male golfers
European Tour golfers
PGA Tour golfers
Sportspeople from Bendigo
1995 births
Living people